This is a list of famous people who have lived in Tbilisi, including both natives and residents.  Some figures in the list may be included in several of the categories simultaneously, but are only included in the sections which pertain to their achievements or occupations the most.

 Irakli Bagration-Mukhraneli, Georgian prince, exiled to Spain
 Tsotne Bakuria, legislature member of Autonomous Republic of Adjara, Georgia
 Kakha Bendukidze, Georgian businessman
 Lavrenti Beria, head of the NKVD (the predecessor to the KGB), supervisor and one of the initiators of the Soviet Union's Nuclear Project
 Giga Bokeria, Georgian political leader
 Ilia Chavchavadze, writer, politician, public benefactor
 Gela Charkviani, politician, current Ambassador of Georgia in the UK
 Kakutsa Cholokashvili, national hero of Georgia
 Zviad Gamsakhurdia, former president of Georgia
 Alexander Griboedov, diplomat, playwright, composer
 Tedo Isakadze, politician and business founder
 Vyacheslav Ivankov, Russian mafia boss and thief in law
 Merab Kostava, national hero and anti-Soviet activist
 Zurab Pololikashvili, 6th Secretary-General of the World Tourism Organization
 Mikheil Saakashvili, former president of Georgia
 Eduard Shevardnadze, former president of Georgia and Minister of Foreign Affairs of the Soviet Union
 Joseph Stalin, leader of the Soviet Union
 Ekvtime Takaishvili, politician and public benefactor
 Giorgi Targamadze, Georgia politician
 Aslan Usoyan, Georgian mobster, Russian mafia boss and thief in law
 Noe Zhordania, Prime Minister of independent Georgia in 1918-1921
 Irakli Zhorzholiani, politician and scientist
 Zurab Zhvania, former prime minister of Georgia

Writers
 Boris Akunin, writer
 Hovaness Toumanian, poet and writer
 Nikoloz Baratashvili, poet and writer
 Konstantine Gamsakhurdia, one of the most influential Georgian writers of the 20th century
 Mirza Fatali Akhundov, writer
 Hakob Melik-Hakobyan (Raffi), writer
 Ryurik Ivnev, poet
 Dagny Juel, writer
 Nar-Dos, Armenian writer
 Zurab Samadashvili, writer and playwright
 Akaki Tsereteli, writer
 Lesya Ukrainka, Ukrainian poet
 Friedrich Martin von Bodenstedt, writer
 Chabua Amirejibi, writer

Scientists, engineers, designers and inventors
 Malkhaz Abdushelishvili, scientist (anthropologist)
 Andria Apakidze, scientist (archaeologist)
 Viktor Amazaspovich Ambartsumian, astronomer
 Georgy Mikhailovich Beriev, aircraft designer, founder of the Beriev Design Bureau
 Felix d'Herelle, French-Canadian microbiologist, one of the discoverers of bacteriophages
 Revaz Dogonadze, physicist
 Tamaz Gamkrelidze, linguist
 Joseph Jordania, ethnomusicologist, evolutionary musicologist
 Alexander Kartveli (Kartvelishvili), aircraft engineer
 Gustav Radde, scientist
 Alexander de Seversky, aircraft engineer
 Otto Wilhelm Hermann von Abich, mineralogist and geologist

Musicians, singers and composers

 Robert Bardzimashvili, singer, founder of Orera, Via-75
 Lisa Batiashvili, violinist
 Rashid Behbudov, singer
 Paata Burchuladze, operatic bass, civil activist and politician
 Feodor Chaliapin, opera singer
 Irakli Charkviani, Georgian poet and rock/pop singer
 Niaz Diasamidze, Georgian composer and folk rock singer, founder of the band 33a
 Givi Gachechiladze, composer, conductor, Tbilisi State Orchestra "Rero", The Mardzhanishvili Theater Orchestra, Tbilisi Municipal Concert Orchestra
 Hamlet Gonashvili, tenor
 Stella Grigorian, opera singer
 Alexander Melik-Pashayev, Soviet conductor
 Niyazi Hajibeyov, conductor, composer
 Mikhail Ippolitov-Ivanov, composer
 Giya Kancheli, composer
 Rudolf Kehrer, pianist
 Aram Khachaturian, composer
 Srbui Lisitsian, Armenian-Soviet folk dance ethnographer
 Zakharia Paliashvili, composer, founder of Georgian classical music
 Anita Rachvelishvili, Georgian mezzo-soprano
 Sayat-Nova, ashugh
 Irma Sokhadze, singer, pianist, composer and TV presenter
 Tsisana Tatishvili, opera singer
 Anoushavan Ter-Ghevondyan, Armenian composer, pedagogue, and sociocultural activist
 Alexander Toradze, pianist
 Lev Vlassenko, pianist
 Elena Dzamashvili, pianist

Theatre, cinema, arts and entertainment
 Tengiz Abuladze, film director
 Elene Akhvlediani, painter
 Nino Ananiashvili, ballerina
 Gela Babluani, film director; directed the acclaimed film 13 Tzameti
 Temur Babluani, film director
 Ramaz Chkhikvadze, theatre, cinema artist
 Georgi Daneliya, film director
 Haykanoush Danielyan, opera singer
 Lado Gudiashvili, painter
 Otar Ioseliani, film director
 Gayane Khachaturian, Georgian-Armenian painter
 Vakhtang Kikabidze, actor
 Yervand Kochar, Armenian painter
 Arpenik Nalbandyan, Armenian painter
 Dmitry Nalbandyan, Armenian painter
 Sergei Parajanov, producer
 Elena Satine, actor, singer
 Robert Sturua, director
 Natela Tchkonia, opera singer
 Georgy Tovstonogov, Russian theatre director
 Avksenty Tsagareli, playwright
 Zurab Tsereteli, artist, architect
 Marie Vorobieff, painter
 Ruben Zakharian, Armenian painter

Sports figures
 Shota Arveladze, soccer player
 Maia Chiburdanidze, former women's world chess champion
 Vitali Daraselia, former football (soccer) player for Dinamo Tbilisi and the Soviet Union National Team
 Roman Dzindzichashvili, chess grandmaster
 Teymuraz Gabashvili, tennis player
 Nona Gaprindashvili, former women's world chess champion
 Elene Gedevanishvili, figure skater
 Kakha Kaladze, football (soccer) player for the Georgia national football team and AC Milan
 David Kipiani, former football (soccer) player for Dinamo Tbilisi and the Soviet Union National Team
 Khvicha Kvaratskhelia, football (soccer) player for Napoli and the Georgia national football team
 Zaza Pachulia, NBA player
 Tigran Petrosian, former world chess champion
 Murtaz Shelia, former football player for Dinamo Tbilisi and Manchester City
 Zurab Zviadauri, judoka
 Ilias Iliadis, judoka
Tornike Shengelia (born 1991), basketball player

Military figures
 Konstantine "Kote" Abkhazi, general
 Timur Apakidze, general
 Hovhannes Bagramyan, military commander and Marshal of the Soviet Union
 Aleksei Brusilov, Russian cavalry general
 Anatoli Gekker, Soviet commander
 Giorgi Kvinitadze, founder of the Tbilisi Junker school
 Mikhail Tarielovich Loris-Melikov, general
 Giorgi Mazniashvili, general

Other
 Mikael Aramyants, businessman and philanthropist 
 Zurab Avalishvili, historian
 Arnold Chikobava, linguist
 Jeanne de Salzmann, mystic
 Pavel Florensky, philosopher, theologian
 Irene Galitzine, fashion designer
 Ivane Javakhishvili, historian, public benefactor
 Alexander Mantashev, prominent Armenian oil magnate, industrialist, financier, and philanthropist
 Tako Natsvlishvili, fashion model
 Tamar Tumanyan (1907–1989), Soviet Armenian architect

Honorary citizens
People awarded the honorary citizenship of Tbilisi are:

See also 
 al-Tiflisi

References

Tbilisians
 List
Tblisi